The ribboned pipefish (Haliichthys taeniophorus), ribboned pipehorse or ribboned seadragon, is a species of pipefish found along the coast of northern Australia (Shark Bay to Torres Strait) and New Guinea (both West New Guinea and Papua New Guinea) in habitats ranging from shallow and weedy to deeper and sandy bottoms down to depths of . Their colors can range from greenish yellow to brownish red. This species is the only known member of its genus.

References

External links
 Fishes of Australia : Haliichthys taeniophorus

Syngnathidae
Fish of New Guinea
Marine fish of Northern Australia
Fish described in 1859
Taxa named by John Edward Gray